"Probably Wouldn't Be This Way" is a song written by John Kennedy and Tammi Kidd, and recorded by American country music singer LeAnn Rimes.  It was released in April 2005 as the second single from the album This Woman.

Content
It is generally accepted as a haunting song with a darker tone.  Although considered by many to be a typical break-up song, the lyrics, "You ought'a see the way these people look at me / When they see me 'round here talkin' to this stone," suggest that the song is actually about the death of a lover. The video suggests that the person she is referring to was her husband since she is shown wearing a wedding band.

In an interview with Biography, LeAnn explains that "the story is of a woman who is mourning the loss of losing her lover and doesn't know if she can move on again from that."

Chart performance

Year-end charts

Music video
In the music video, which was directed by David McClister, LeAnn Rimes is wearing a ring on her ring finger, suggesting that she was married. Towards the beginning of the video, a wedding dress and flowers are in her house that would usually be seen at a funeral. Other scenes show her knocking feathers out of a pillow, lying on a bed, and trying to attempt suicide by drowning in a bathtub.

The music video was ranked 29th on CMT's 100 Greatest Videos.

References

External links 
 

2005 singles
2005 songs
LeAnn Rimes songs
Song recordings produced by Dann Huff
Curb Records singles
Country ballads